Heather Ankeny is an American actress. She has appeared on Criminal Minds, Rizzoli & Isles, Battle Creek, and Weeds, as well as the independent feature films, DriverX and Pig. She is an avid fantasy sports player, frequently contributing to ESPN's Fantasy section, including both the "Fantasy Focus" video and audio podcasts.

Filmography

Film

Television

References

Year of birth missing (living people)
Living people
American television actresses
American film actresses
Place of birth missing (living people)
21st-century American women